The Tangen–Horn Ferry is an automobile ferry in Gran, Innlandet county, Norway. It operates on the lake Randsfjorden, connecting Bjoneroa in the west with Brandbu and Søndre Land in the east.

Ferry transport in Innlandet